Jack Werner Stauffacher (December 19, 1920 – November 16, 2017) was an American printer, typographer, educator, and fine book publisher. He owned and operated Greenwood Press, a small book printing press based in the San Francisco Bay Area.

He taught classes in design, typography, and printmaking at Carnegie Mellon University, Stanford University, University of California, Santa Cruz, and San Francisco Art Institute.

Biography 
Stauffacher was born in San Francisco, California, in 1920, and he grew up in nearby San Mateo, California. His father Frank A. Stauffacher was a plumber, and his mother was Elsa R. Stauffacher. His brother, Frank Stauffacher, was a filmmaker and ran the pioneering Art in Cinema cinema series at the San Francisco Museum of Modern Art from 1946 to 1954. His sister in law was designer Barbara Stauffacher Solomon.

At the age of 13, he established the Greenwood Press. The press was named after the street on which it was located, in a small building that he and his father built behind the family home in San Mateo, California. His first printed book appeared in 1941 when he was 20 years old, Washington Irving's "Three Choice Sketches By Geoffrey Crayon, Gent" based on The Sketch Book of Geoffrey Crayon, Gent..

In 1955, he received a Fulbright grant for three years of study in Florence, Italy, and decided to close Greenwood Press.

After his return to the United States, he became assistant professor of typographic design at Carnegie Mellon University and his work led to the formation of the New Laboratory Press. He went on to become typographic director at Stanford University Press and to teach at the San Francisco Art Institute (SFAI), and University of California, Santa Cruz. One of his former students was artist Tom Killion.

In 1966, he reopened the Greenwood Press in a building at 300 Broadway in the North Beach neighborhood of San Francisco and resumed producing books and limited editions such as Albert Camus and the Men of Stone (1971). In 1967, he was commissioned to redesign the Journal of Typographic Research, later renamed Visible Language. The typographic composition he used for its cover was used for many years.

Stauffacher was added to the distinguished list of AIGA medalists in 2004.

Several of his experimental compositions using wood and metal type are in the permanent collections of the San Francisco Museum of Modern Art (SFMOMA), the Stanford University Library, and the Los Angeles County Museum of Art (LACMA). He was the subject of an article and his work featured on the cover of the groundbreaking Emigre magazine in 1998.

Publications

Biography 
Much of his life and work is documented in the book A Typographic Journey: The History of the Greenwood Press (1999) published as a limited edition book by the Book Club of California.

Greenwood Press publications

Art exhibition related

Exhibitions 
This is a list of select exhibition of Jack Stauffacher.

 2019 – Between the Lines: Typography in LACMA’s Collection (group exhibition), Los Angeles County Museum of Art (LACMA), Los Angeles, California
 2013 – Stauffacher and (Donald) Judd (group exhibition), Los Angeles County Museum of Art (LACMA), Los Angeles, California
2011 – Arch: A Book Project by Holly Downing and Jack Stauffacher (group exhibition), Graham Foundation and Festival of the Architecture Book, Chicago, Illinois
2008-2009 – 246 and Counting, Recent Architecture + Design Acquisitions, San Francisco Museum of Modern Art (SFMOMA), San Francisco, California
2004-2005  – Belles Lettres: The Art of Typography (group exhibition), San Francisco Museum of Modern Art, San Francisco, California
2002 – Jack Stauffacher: Selections from the Permanent Collection of Architecture and Design (solo exhibition), San Francisco Museum of Modern Art, San Francisco, California

Awards

1955, Fulbright grant
2004, AIGA Medal

Death and legacy 
Stauffacher died at home in Tiburon, California, in November 2017, at the age of 96.

His work was the subject of a short biographical documentary film by filmmaker Jim Faris, Jack Stauffacher, Printer (2002).

See also

Stanford University Press

References

External links
AIGA Medalist article
documentation of Jack Stauffacher exhibitions
dot font article on Stauffacher with Hermann Zapf
Oral history interview with Jack Werner Stauffacher, 1993 February 8 from Archives of American Art, Smithsonian Institution
Video: Jack Stauffacher: Typographic Experiments (2013) by Los Angeles County Museum of Art (LACMA) on YouTube
Video: Jack Stauffacher, Printer (2002) by Jim Faris on YouTube
Jack Stauffacher, a typographer and printer who mixed classicism and the avant-garde
Only on Saturday: The Wood Type Prints of Jack Stauffacher October 16, 2019

1920 births
2017 deaths
AIGA medalists
People from San Francisco
Carnegie Mellon University faculty
San Francisco Art Institute faculty
Typography
American typographers and type designers
American publishers (people)
Educators from California
American printmakers
People from San Mateo, California
Letterpress printmakers
Small press publishing companies